TV9 Bharatvarsh, launched on 30 March 2019, is an Indian Hindi-language news channel owned by the TV9 Network. It became the No. 2 popular Hindi news channel within a year. TV9 Bharatvarsh appointed Barun Das as CEO in 2019. It has been doing 24/7 coverage of the 2022 Russian invasion of Ukraine.

TV9 Network, also launched Money9, India’s first multilingual personal finance OTT Channel. A unique proposition, the Money9 OTT App is now live on Android and IOS platforms with seven language options of Hindi, English, Bangla, Telugu, Marathi, Gujarati and Kannada.

References

External links 
 Website

24-hour television news channels in India
TV9 Group
Hindi-language television channels in India
Hindi-language television stations
Television channels and stations established in 2019
Mass media in Mumbai
Mass media companies of India
2019 establishments in Uttar Pradesh